Universals may refer to: 

 Cultural universals
 Linguistic universals 
 Universals in metaphysics
 Aristotle's theory of universals
 Problem of universals
 Universals (Central Council of Ukraine), a series of legal declarations 1917–1918

See also
 Universal (disambiguation)